KMAD may refer to:

 KMAD (AM), a radio station (1550 AM) licensed to Madill, Oklahoma, United States
 KMAD-FM, a radio station (102.5 FM) licensed to Whitesboro, Texas, United States